The 1994–95 Oklahoma Sooners men's basketball team represented the University of Oklahoma in competitive college basketball during the 1994–95 NCAA Division I men's basketball season. The Oklahoma Sooners men's basketball team played its home games in the Lloyd Noble Center and was a member of the National Collegiate Athletic Association's Big 12 Conference.

The team posted a 23–9 overall record (9–5 Big Eight). The Sooners received a bid to the 1995 NCAA tournament as No. 4 seed in the Southeast region. The Sooners lost to No. 11 seed Manhattan, 77–67, in the opening round.

Roster

Schedule and results

|-
!colspan=9 style=| Non-conference regular season

|-
!colspan=9 style=| Big Eight Regular Season

|-
!colspan=9 style=| Big Eight Tournament

|-
!colspan=9 style=| NCAA Tournament

Rankings

References

Oklahoma Sooners men's basketball seasons
Oklahoma
Oklahoma